The 2006–07 ISU Junior Grand Prix was the tenth season of the ISU Junior Grand Prix, a series of international junior level competitions organized by the International Skating Union. It was the Junior-level complement to the 2006–07 ISU Grand Prix of Figure Skating, which was for Senior-level skaters. Skaters compete in the disciplines of men's singles, ladies' singles, pair skating, and ice dance. The top skaters from the series met at the Junior Grand Prix Final.

Skaters who reached the age of 13 by July 1, 2006 but had not turned 19 (singles and females of the other two disciplines) or 21 (male pair skaters and ice dancers) were eligible to compete on the junior circuit.

Competitions
The locations of the JGP events change yearly. In the 2006–07 season, the series was composed of the following events:

Junior Grand Prix Final qualifiers
The following skaters qualified for the 2006–07 Junior Grand Prix Final, in order of qualification.

Devora Radeva was given the host wildcard spot to the Junior Grand Prix Final.

Medalists

Men

Ladies

Pairs

Ice dance

Medals table

References

External links

 2006–07 ISU Junior Grand Prix of Figure Skating
 2006 Junior Grand Prix Taipei Official site
 
 
 
 
 
 
 
 
 

ISU Junior Grand Prix
Junior Grand Prix
2006 in youth sport
2007 in youth sport